The 2016 U.S. Women's Open was the 71st U.S. Women's Open, held July 7–10 at CordeValle Golf Club in San Martin, California, southeast of San Jose.

The U.S. Women's Open is the oldest of the five current major championships and the third of the 2016 season. It has the largest purse in women's golf at $4.5 million, and was televised by Fox Sports 1 and Fox Sports.

Brittany Lang won her first major title in a playoff over Anna Nordqvist.

Qualifying and field
The championship was open to any female professional or amateur golfer with a USGA handicap index not exceeding 2.4. Players qualified by competing in one of twenty 36-hole qualifying tournaments held at sites across the United States and at international sites in China, England, Japan, and South Korea. Additional players were exempt from qualifying because of past performances in professional or amateur tournaments around the world. The USGA received a record 1,855 entries for the championship.

Exempt from qualifying
Many players are exempt in multiple categories. Players are listed only once, in the first category in which they became exempt, with additional categories in parentheses next to their names. Golfers qualifying in Category 13 who qualified in other categories are denoted with the tour by which they qualified.

1. Winners of the U.S. Women's Open for the last ten years (2006–2015)
Choi Na-yeon (10,15,16), Chun In-gee (9,11,13-KLPGA,15,16), Paula Creamer (10,15), Ji Eun-hee (10,15,16), Cristie Kerr (10,12,15,16), Ryu So-yeon (9,10,15,16), Michelle Wie (10)
Inbee Park (5,6,7,9,10,12,15,16) – thumb injury and Annika Sörenstam did not enter the tournament

2. Winner and runner-up from the 2015 U.S. Women's Amateur (must be an amateur)
Hannah O'Sullivan (a), Sierra Brooks (a)

3. Winner of the 2016 British Ladies Amateur Golf Championship (must be an amateur)
Julia Engström (a)

4. Winner of the 2015 Mark H. McCormack Medal (Women's World Amateur Golf Ranking) (must be an amateur)
Leona Maguire (a)

5. Winners of the Women's PGA Championship for the last five years (2012–2016)
Shanshan Feng (13-LET,14,15,16), Brooke Henderson (9,11,12,15,16)

6. Winners of the Women's British Open for the last five years (2011–2015)
Stacy Lewis (9,10,15,16), Mo Martin (16), Yani Tseng
Jiyai Shin (13-JLPGA,15,16) did not enter the tournament

7. Winners of the ANA Inspiration for the last five years (2012–2016)
Lydia Ko (8,10,11,12,15,16), Brittany Lincicome (15,16), Lexi Thompson (11,12,15,16), Yoo Sun-young (10)

8. Winners of the Evian Championship (2013–2015)
Kim Hyo-joo (12, 13-KLPGA,15,16), Suzann Pettersen (10,15,16)

9. Ten lowest scorers and anyone tying for 10th place from the 2015 U.S. Women's Open
Pernilla Lindberg (10), Shiho Oyama (15,16), Jane Park (10), Morgan Pressel (10,15,16) Amy Yang (10,15,16)

10. Top 75 money leaders from the 2015 final official LPGA money list
Marina Alex, Baek Kyu-jung, Chella Choi (12,15,16), Carlota Ciganda (15,16), Austin Ernst, Sandra Gal, Julieta Granada, Jaye Marie Green, Wei Ling Hsu, Charley Hull (15,16), M. J. Hur, Karine Icher, Jang Ha-na (11,12,15,16), Ariya Jutanugarn (12,15,16), Moriya Jutanugarn, Danielle Kang, Kim Kaufman, Christina Kim, In-Kyung Kim, Kim Sei-young (11,15,16), Jessica Korda (12,15,16), Candie Kung (15,16), Brittany Lang (15,16), Alison Lee (15,16), Ilhee Lee (15), Lee Mi-hyang (15), Min Lee, Minjee Lee (11,12,15,16), Mirim Lee (15,16), Caroline Masson, Catriona Matthew, Maria McBride, Sydnee Michaels, Mika Miyazato (15,16), Azahara Muñoz (15,16), Haru Nomura (11,12,15,16), Anna Nordqvist (15,16), Ryann O'Toole, Lee-Anne Pace (15,16), Park Hee-young (16), Pornanong Phatlum (15,16), Gerina Piller (11,15,16), Beatriz Recari, Lizette Salas (15), Alena Sharp, Jenny Shin (11,12,15,16), Kelly Shon, Jennifer Song, Angela Stanford, Kris Tamulis (12), Mariajo Uribe, Karrie Webb (15), Sakura Yokomine

11. Top 10 money leaders from the 2016 official LPGA money list, through the close of entries on May 4

12. Winners of LPGA co-sponsored events, whose victories are considered official, from the conclusion of the 2015 U.S. Women's Open to the initiation of the 2016 U.S. Women's Open

13. Top five money leaders from the 2015 Japan LPGA Tour, Korea LPGA Tour and Ladies European Tour
Japan LPGA Tour: Ahn Sun-ju (15,16), Lee Bo-mee (15,16), Teresa Lu (15,16)
Korea LPGA Tour: Cho Yoon-ji, Lee Jung-min (15, 16), Park Sung-hyun (15,16)
Ladies European Tour: Melissa Reid, Nicole Broch Larsen, Gwladys Nocera, Beth Allen
Jang Su-yeon (KLPGA,16), Ko Jin-young (KLPGA,15,16), Lee Ji-hee (JLPGA,15), did not play

14. Top three money leaders from the 2015 China LPGA Tour
Ssu-Chia Cheng, Xi Yu Lin
Pan Yan-hong did not play

15. Top 50 point leaders from the current Rolex Rankings and anyone tying for 50th place as of May 4

16. Top 50 point leaders from the current Rolex Rankings and anyone tying for 50th place as of July 3
Su-Hyun Oh, Ayaka Watanabe
Kim Ha-neul did not play

17. Special exemptions selected by the USGA
Se Ri Pak

Qualifiers
Additional players qualified through sectional qualifying tournaments taking place in May and June at sites in the United States, China, South Korea, England, and Japan.

May 9 at The Home Course, DuPont, Washington
Naomi Eun Young Ko (a)

May 16 at Cheonan, South Korea
Ryu Hae-ran (a)
Choi Hye-jin (a)

May 16 at Bradenton Country Club, Bradenton, Florida
Nelly Korda
Jodi Ewart Shadoff

May 16 at Butler Country Club, Butler, Pennsylvania
Bailey Tardy (a)
Nannette Hill

May 16 at Pebble Creek Golf Club, Becker, Minnesota
Jing Yan

May 16 at Shady Oaks Country Club, Fort Worth, Texas
Su-Hyun Oh (later qualified in category 16)
Hannah Wood (a)

May 16 at Terravita Golf & Country Club, Scottsdale, Arizona
Marissa Chow (a)
Spencer Heller

May 16 at The Heritage Golf Course at Westmoor, Westminster, Colorado
Jennifer Kupcho (a)
Yu Sang Hou (a)

May 16 at Waialae Country Club, Honolulu, Hawaii
Allisen Corpuz (a)

May 17 at TPC at The Woodlands (Player Course), The Woodlands, Texas
Gaby López
Liv Cheng

May 23 at Quail Ridge Country Club (South Course), Boynton Beach, Florida
Sandra Angulo Minarro
Mika Liu (a)

May 23 at Dunwoody Country Club, Dunwoody, Georgia
Madelene Sagström
Jackie Stoelting

May 23 at Hermitage Country Club, Manakin-Sabot, Virginia
Maude-Aimee Leblanc
Lee Lopez
Christine Song

May 23 at Oak Park Country Club, River Grove, Illinois
Erica Shepherd (a)
Ashleigh Simon

May 24 at Westwood Country Club, St. Louis, Missouri
Kasey Petty
Anna Hack (a)

May 24 at Canoe Brook Country Club (North Course), Summit, New Jersey
Pei-Yun Chien
Sophia Popov

May 25 at Buckinghamshire, England
Jade Schaeffer
Olivia Cowan
Valentine Derrey
Camilla Lennarth
Pamela Pretswell

May 25 at Carolina Trace Country Club (Lake Course), Sanford, North Carolina
Paula Hurtado
Lauren Stephenson (a)

May 26 at Shanghai, China
Yan Liu (a)

May 30 at Ibaraki Prefecture, Japan
Erina Hara
Emi Sato
Ayaka Matsumori
Chika Sawada (a)

May 31 at Twin Hills Country Club, Longmeadow, Massachusetts
Megan Khang
Sue Kim
Miriam Nagl
Kelly Tan
Albane Valenzuela (a)

May 31 at Industry Hills Golf Club (Eisenhower Course), City Of Industry, California
Alexandra Kaui (a)
Angel Yin

May 31 at Green Valley Country Club, Fairfield, California
Taylor Kim
Julie Yang

June 2 at Goose Creek Golf Club, Mira Loma, California
Robynn Ree (a)
Karah Sanford (a)

June 3 at Sugar Mill Country Club, New Smyrna Beach, Florida
Rinko Mitsunaga (a)
Sandra Changkija

Alternates added to field
The following players were added to the field before the start of the tournament when spots reserved for exemptions in various categories were not used, and to replace players who withdrew from the tournament. 
Amy Anderson, Hannah Burke, Chih-Min Chen (a), Cydney Clanton, Kotone Hori, Caroline Inglis, Yunjie Zhang (a)

Nationalities in the field

Past champions in the field

Made the cut

Missed the cut

Course layout

Scoring average: 74.49
 by round: 74.37, 75.22, 72.69, 73.93
Most difficult holes in relation to par: 14, 2, 9, 1, 8

Source:

Round summaries

First round
Thursday, July 7, 2016

Second round
Friday, July 8, 2016

Third round
Saturday, July 9, 2016

Final round
Sunday, July 10, 2016
  
Source:

Scorecard
Final round

Cumulative tournament scores, relative to par

Source:

Playoff
The three-hole aggregate playoff was held on the final three holes, and any additional play in sudden-death was to occur on the final hole. Both players made pars on the first two holes, but it was soon determined that Nordqvist had slightly moved sand prior to her approach shot from the fairway bunker on 17, a two-stroke penalty (rule 13-4b). The players were told of the penalty by a rules official midway through the par-5 final hole, after Nordqvist's third shot but before Lang's.

Playoff held on holes 16, 17, and 18.

Scorecard

Cumulative playoff scores, relative to par
Source:

References

External links

2016 U.S. Women's Open at LPGA official site

U.S. Women's Open
Golf in California
Sports competitions in California
U.S. Women's Open
U.S. Women's Open
U.S. Women's Open
U.S. Women's Open
Women's sports in California